Charles Ryskamp (October 21, 1928 – March 26, 2010) was a former director of both The Frick Collection and the Pierpont Morgan Library, a longtime professor at Princeton University, and an avid collector of drawings and prints. He was born in East Grand Rapids, Michigan, or Grand Rapids, Michigan. At the time of his death the Yale Center for British Art had selections from his collection featured in the exhibition "Varieties of Romantic Experience: Drawings from the Collection of Charles Ryskamp".  This exhibition, which was to be up from February 4 until April 25, 2010, included works from Ryskamp's collection by Romantic period artists such as J. M. W. Turner, William Blake, David Wilkie and Caspar David Friedrich.  His collection of Danish Golden Age drawings with works by among others Christen Købke and Johan Thomas Lundbye was one of the finest in private hands.

Ryskamp was elected to the American Philosophical Society in 1995.

Charles Ryskamp died on March 26, 2010 at the age of 81. The Ryskamp collection was sold at auction by Sotheby's in New York City primarily to benefit Princeton University on January 25, 2011, during the house's Old Masters week.

References

External links
 Exhibition at the Yale Center for British Art
 Sotheby's ecatalogue of the Ryskamp Collection

American curators
American art collectors
1928 births
2010 deaths
Calvin University alumni
People from Grand Rapids, Michigan
People from East Grand Rapids, Michigan
Members of the American Philosophical Society